The fourth season of The Real Housewives of Melbourne, an Australian reality television series, was broadcast on Arena. It aired from 6 December 2017, until 21 February 2018, and was primarily filmed in Melbourne, Victoria. Its executive producers are Kylie Washington and Lisa Potasz for Matchbox Pictures, part of NBCUniversal International Studios, in conjunction with Foxtel.

The Real Housewives of Melbourne focuses on the lives of Jackie Gillies, Gina Liano, Janet Roach, Lydia Schiavello, Gamble Breaux, Sally Bloomfield and Venus Behbahani Clark; It consisted of twelve episodes.

Production and crew
On 11 May 2016, Lydia Schiavello revealed there would be a fourth season but filming may be delayed to film The Real Housewives of Sydney first. A month later in June 2016, Liano also confirmed there would be a season four and the filming delay for the Sydney series, adding that "the original girls are out of contract now. They haven't approached us to renegotiate contracts yet." In December 2016, season four was officially confirmed by Foxtel, also being reported that filming is set to begin in early 2017.

Cast and synopsis
Five of the eight housewives from season 3 returned for the new season. Prior to the conclusion of the third season, on 8 May 2016, original housewife Chyka Keebaugh announced that she would not be returning to the series. On 29 April 2017, Pettifeur Berenger announced that she would also not be returning to the new series. Shortly after, on 30 April 2017, Susie McLean also parted ways with the show deciding to focus on other projects. On 17 May 2017, the season 4 cast was announced, with Venus Behbahani-Clark and Sally Bloomfield joining the cast along with the returning cast members Liano, Schiavello, Gillies, Breaux and Roach. This also confirmed the departures of Keebaugh, Berenger and McLean. However, Keebaugh did make a guest appearance during one episode in the fourth season.

Venus Behbahani Clark, a 35-year-old mother of two is “Persian born. She grew up in Italy migrating to Australia in the ‘80s.” Venus is a housewife lawyer and is also currently working on her own line of contouring cosmetics. She is described as “incredibly competitive, opinionated, smart and confident” She has 2 children Giselle and Sophia both from a previous marriage. Venus and her husband James own property in Melbourne, Dubai and Lake Como.

Sally Bloomfield is a 51-year-old widow and mother of two boys Nic and Jules. She owns a homewares store, Bloomfield and Webber in Barwon Heads, and a boutique hotel in Bali. She is also set to launch her accessories range, Bloomfield - focussing on sunglasses and handbags later this year. Sally used to be the editor of the Melbourne edition of the Harper’s Bazaar Magazine and has lived in Bali for the last five years.

Taglines
Gina: "I stand by what I say, but not how you interpret it."
Gamble: "When you finally fall on your feet, people will still try to bring you down."
Lydia: "I save my best pot stirring for the kitchen."
Sally: "I've turned each painful ending into a big beautiful beginning."
Janet: "If you're offended by what I say, imagine what i'm thinking."
Venus: "When you're named after the hottest planet, things are sure to get fiery."
Jackie: "I'll always follow my intuition and let the angels do the rest."

Episodes
{| class="wikitable plainrowheaders"
|+The Real Housewives of Melbourne, season 4 episodes
|-
! scope="col" style="background-color: #7699be;" | No. inseries
! scope="col" style="background-color: #7699be" | No. inseason
! scope="col" style="background-color: #7699be;" | Title
! scope="col" style="background-color: #7699be;" | Original air date
! scope="col" style="background-color: #7699be;" | Overnight Australian viewers
|-

|}

References

The Real Housewives of Melbourne
2017 Australian television seasons
2018 Australian television seasons